Clariana de Cardener is a municipality in the comarca of the Solsonès in Catalonia, Spain. It is situated on the Cardener river below the reservoir of Sant Ponç. The village is served by the C-1410 road between Cardona and Solsona.

Subdivisions 
The municipality of Clariana de Cardener is formed of four villages. Populations are given as of 2005:
Clariana de Cardener (42)
Hortoneda (26)
Sant Just i Joval (50)
Sant Ponç (31)

References

 Panareda Clopés, Josep Maria; Rios Calvet, Jaume; Rabella Vives, Josep Maria (1989). Guia de Catalunya, Barcelona: Caixa de Catalunya.  (Spanish).  (Catalan).

External links
Official website 
 Government data pages 

Municipalities in Solsonès
Populated places in Solsonès